The Bhagavata Purana, also known as the Srimad Bhagavatam, Srimad Bhagavata Mahapurana  or simply Bhagavata, is one of Hinduism's eighteen great Puranas (Mahapuranas). Composed in Sanskrit by Veda Vyasa, it promotes bhakti (devotion) towards Krishna, an avatar of Vishnu, integrating themes from the Advaita (monism) philosophy of Adi Shankara, the Vishishtadvaita (qualified monism) of Ramanujacharya and the Dvaita (dualism) of Madhvacharya. It is widely available in almost all Indian languages.

The Bhagavata Purana, like other puranas, discusses a wide range of topics including cosmology, astronomy, genealogy, geography, legend, music, dance, yoga and culture. As it begins, the forces of evil have won a war between the benevolent devas (deities) and evil asuras (demons) and now rule the universe. Truth re-emerges as Krishna, (called "Hari" and "Vāsudeva" in the text) – first makes peace with the demons, understands them and then creatively defeats them, bringing back hope, justice, freedom and happiness – a cyclic theme that appears in many legends.

The Bhagavata Purana is a revered text in Vaishnavism, a Hindu tradition that reveres Vishnu. The text presents a form of religion (dharma) that competes with that of the Vedas, wherein bhakti ultimately leads to self-knowledge, salvation (moksha) and bliss. However the Bhagavata Purana asserts that the inner nature and outer form of Krishna is identical to the Vedas and that this is what rescues the world from the forces of evil. An oft-quoted verse (1.3.40) is used by some Krishna sects to assert that the text itself is Krishna in literary form.

The date of composition is probably between the eighth and the tenth century CE, but may be as early as the 6th century CE. Manuscripts survive in numerous inconsistent versions revised through the 18th century creating various recensions both in the same languages and across different Indian languages.

The text consists of twelve books (skandhas) totalling 332 chapters (adhyayas) and 18,000 verses. The tenth book, with about 4,000 verses, has been the most popular and widely studied. It was the first Purana to be translated into a European language as a French translation of a Tamil version appeared in 1788 and introduced many Europeans to Hinduism and 18th-century Hindu culture during the colonial era.

Nomenclature 
'Bhagavata Purana' can be translated as 'the history of the devotees of Vishnu'. 'Srimad Bhagavatam' can be translated as 'the glorious devotees of Vishnu'.

'Bhagavata' (or 'Bhagavatam' or 'Bhagavat', Sanskrit भागवत) means 'follower or worshipper of Vishnu'.
'Bhagavan' (Sanskrit भगवन्) means 'Blessed One', 'God', or 'Lord'. Krishna - the transcendental, primeval Personality of Godhead, avatar of Vishnu - is directly referred to as 'Bhagavan' throughout this scripture. It is stated in canto 1, chapter 3, verse 28, "kṛṣṇas tu bhagavān svayam" which A.C. Bhaktivedanta Swami Prabhupada translates as, "Lord Śrī Kṛṣṇa is the original Personality of Godhead."
'Purana' (Sanskrit पुराण) means 'ancient' or 'old' (or 'old traditional history'). It also means 'complete' and 'completing' in the sense that a Purana 'completes the Vedas'.
'Maha' (Sanskrit महत्) means 'great', 'large', or 'vast'.
'Srimad' (or 'Srimat', Sanskrit श्रीमत्) means 'radiant', 'holy', 'splendid', or 'glorious', and is an honorific religious title.
'Sri' (or 'Shri' or 'Shree', Sanskrit श्री) means 'wealth'. Lakshmi - Goddess of Wealth and Vishnu/Krishna's wife - is also referred to as 'Sri'.
'Mad' (or 'Mat', Sanskrit मत्) means 'religion' or 'believed'.
Those with a wealth ('Sri') of religion ('mad') may be honoured with the title of 'radiant', 'holy', 'splendid', or 'glorious' ('Srimad').

Content and structure 
The 18,000 verses of the Srimad Bhagavatam consist of several interconnected, interwoven, and non-linear dialogues, teachings, and explanations espousing Bhakti Yoga that go back and forth in time and across its twelve cantos:

Stated authorship and purpose
From the Ganesh Vasudeo Tagare / N.P. Jain for Motilal Banarsidass translation:

From the Bibek Debroy translation:

A unique and especial emphasis is placed on fostering transcendental loving devotion to Krishna as the ultimate good, i.e. for its own sake rather than for fruitive results or rewards such as detachment or worldly or heavenly gains, a practice known as Bhakti Yoga:

Puranic characteristics 
As detailed in the Matsya Mahapurana, all Puranas must cover at least five specific subjects or topics - referred to in Sanskrit as Pancha Lakshana (literally meaning 'consisting of five characteristics' - in addition to other information including specific deities and the four aims or goals of life. From the K.L. Joshi (editor) translation:

A sattvic Vaishnava Mahapurana (‘great purana’), the Srimad Bhagavatam adds another five characteristics, expanding this list to ten. From the J.M. Sanyal translation:

The Bhagavata further elaborates on the differences between lesser and greater Puranas possessing five or ten characteristics, respectively. From the Disciples of Swami Prabhupada / BBT translation:

Shlokas / verses 
Although the number of original Sanskrit shlokas is stated to be 18,000 by the Bhagavata itself - and by other Puranas such as the Matsya mahapurana - the number of equivalent verses when translated into other languages varies, even between translations into the same language and based on the same manuscript The English translation by Bibek Debroy (BD), for example, contains 78 more verses than the English translation by A.C. Bhaktivedanta Swami Prabhupada / BBT, despite likely being based on the same manuscript:

In his discussion on the issue of varying numbers of verses in translations of the Srimad Bhagavatam, Debroy states:

Manuscript 

Contrary to the western cultural tradition of novelty, poetic or artistic license with existing materials is a strong tradition in Indian culture, a 'tradition of several hundred years of linguistic creativity. There are variations of original manuscripts available for each Purana, including the Srimad Bhagavatam. The common manuscript for translations of the Bhagavata Purana - seemingly used by both Swami Prabhupada and Bibek Debroy- is the Bhāgavatamahāpurāṇam (Nag Publishers, Delhi), a reprint of Khemraj Shri Krishnadas' manuscript (Venkateshvara Press, Bombay). In regards to variances in Puranic manuscripts, academic Dr. Gregory Bailey states:

 Critical Edition 
The Bhāgavata [Śrīmad Bhāgavata Mahāpurāṇa]: Critical Edition, edited by H. G. Shastri, et al., 4 vols. in 6 parts, Ahmedabad: B. J. Institute of Learning and Research, 1996-2002 (vol. 1, skandhas 1-3, ed. by H. G. Shastri, 1996; vol. 2, skandhas 4-6, ed. by Bharati K. Shelat, 1999; vol. 3, skandhas 7-9, ed. respectively by H. G. Shastri, B. K. Shelat, and K. K. Shastree, 1998; vol. 4, part 1, skandha 10, ed. by K. K. Shastree, 1997; vol. 4, part 2, skandhas 11-12, ed. by K. K. Shastree, 1998; vol. 4, part 3, Epilogue, by K. K. Shastree, 2002).

 Date of origin 

According to the Bhagavata Purana itself, it was  spoken to  Parikshit about 5,000 years ago and was recited and chanted by devotees up until the present day. Academics estimate the date of composition is probably around the sixth century CE, but may be as early as the 1st century BCE. Manuscripts survive in numerous, inconsistent versions revised through the 18th century, creating various recensions both in the same languages and across different Indian languages.

 Characters 
All tables provided apply to all complete translations of the Bhagavata Purana. All tables can also be sorted by column title.

 Avatars of Vishnu 
The table below is primarily based on the avatars listed in Canto 1, Chapter 3 (SB 1.3) and Canto 2, Chapter 7 (SB 2.7) of the Srimad Bhagavatam (SB). The number given in parenthesis "()" after a name indicates the order of incarnation as stated in Canto 1. Note that:

 Avatars not listed in the above chapters - such as Hamsa, Hayagriva, and Ajita - are listed based on their primary (or only) appearance in the given cantos.
Avatars featured or appearing repeatedly throughout the scripture are marked with "--" in the Canto column (except Krishna).
Avatars only briefly mentioned (e.g. in the lists above) are marked with a blank space in the Canto column.
 Various appearances of Vishnu and Krishna (e.g. during sacrifices and visions) are not listed.
 Duplicates or expansions of the Krishna avatar are not listed (e.g. the 16,100 duplicates to marry 16,100 rescued princesses; and the duplicates of the cowherd boys and calves hidden by Brahma in Canto 10).

 Notable devotees 
The table below does not include devotee avatars of Vishnu such as Narada, Kapila, or Prthu.  Devotees featured or appearing repeatedly throughout the scripture are marked with "--" in the Canto column.

 Notable demons and villains 
Many demons (villains) are mentioned throughout the Srimad Bhagavatam; cantos listed concern their primary (or only) appearances and/or descriptions. This table is not exhaustive.

 Cantos 
For ease of reference, synopses of cantos cite the complete 18-volume A.C. Bhaktivedanta Swami Prabhupada / Bhaktivedanta Book Trust (BBT) translation of the Srimad Bhagavatam, available at the Bhaktivedanta Vedabase. It also provides original Sanskrit verses, transliterations, synonyms, and purports. Other translations of quoted verses have also been provided for comparison. The non-exhaustive overviews given apply to all complete translations.SB 1.1.3 original Sanskrit:

Swami Prabhupada translation:

Bibek Debroy translation:

First Canto

Consisting of 19 chapters, the first canto opens with an invocation to Krishna and the assertion that the Srimad Bhagatavam, compiled by Vyasadeva, is sufficient alone to realise God. The overarching narration begins at the onset of Kali Yuga as a dialogue between Sukadeva Gosvami (the son of Vyasadeva) and a group of sages headed by Saunaka, as they perform a thousand-year sacrifice for Krishna and his devotees in the forest of Naimisaranya. Questioned by the sages, topics covered by Suta Gosvami include the:

 Birth of Pariksit - protected in the womb by Krishna - in the aftermath of the devastating Kurukshetra War
 Appearance and instruction of Narada to Vyasadeva on the composition of the Srimad Bhagavatam
 Meditation and inspiration of Vyasadeva on the western bank of the Sarasvati river to compile and revise the Bhagavata
 Teaching of the Bhagavata by Vyasadeva to his already-liberated son, Suka Gosvami
 Departure and disappearance of Krishna, followed by the signs and onset of Kali Yuga
 Retirement of the Pandavas (including King Yudhisthira) and consequent enthronement of Pariksit
 Attempts of Pariksit to stem the influence of Kali before being cursed by a Brahmana boy to die within seven days
 Renunciation of Pariksit, who decided to fast until death (Prayopavesa) on the banks of the Ganges in devotion to Krishna
 Arrival of sages (including Narada and Bhrgu) and their disciples to Pariksit's fast, followed by Suta GosvamiSB 1.3.38 original Sanskrit:

Swami Prabhupada translation:

J.M. Sanyal Translation:

Second Canto

Consisting of 10 chapters, the second canto opens with an invocation to Krishna. The second layer of overarching narration begins as a dialogue between Sukadeva Gosvami and Pariksit on the banks of the Ganges river (narrated by Sukadeva Gosvami to a group of sages headed by Saunaka in the forest of Naimisaranya). Questioned by Pariksit, the topics covered by Suta Gosvami include the:

Transcendental, supreme, eternal, and pure nature of Krishna
 Universal Virat-Rupa and Maha-Vishnu forms of Krishna, as well as His scheduled avatars with their purposes
 Process and laws of creation and annihilation of the universe 
 God realisation, Bhakti Yoga, devotional duties, and the need for a spiritual master (Guru)
 Vedic knowledge, modes of material nature (gunas), karma, false (i.e. materialistic) ego, and illusion and suffering due to ignorance
 Divisions (caste or varna) of society, common religious affiliations, and faith versus atheismSB 2.5.35 original Sanskrit:

Swami Prabhupada translation:

Bibek Debroy translation:

Third Canto

Consisting of 33 chapters, the third canto continues the dialogue between Sukadeva Gosvami and Pariksit on the banks of the Ganges river. Vidura, the sudra incarnation of Yama and devotee of Krishna, is the main protagonist narrated. After being thrown out of his home by King Dhritarashtra (his older half-brother) for admonishing the Kaurava's ignoble behaviour towards the Pandavas, Vidura went on a pilgrimage where he met other devotees of Krishna such as Uddhava and the sage Maitreya; their dialogues form a third layer of narration. Topics covered by Sukadeva Gosvami, Uddhava, and Maitreya include the:
 Remembrance, pastimes, qualities, and kingdom (Vaikuntha) of Krishna
 Universal - Virat-Rupa - form of Vishnu to animate dormant material energy for creation (with Kali, explicitly stated to represent His external energy)
 Emergence of Brahma from Garbhodakasayi Vishnu; Brahma's prayers to Krishna, creation of living beings, and manifestation of the Vedas
 Curse of the Four Kamaras on Jaya and Vijaya and their consequent incarnations as the demons Hiranyaksa and Hiranyakasipu
 Appearance of the Varaha avatar to lift the Earth out of the depths of the Cosmic Ocean (Garbhodakasayi) and destroy Hiranyaksa
 Appearance of the Kapila avatar to expound Sankya philosophy and devotional service (Bhakti Yoga) for Krishna
 Principles of material nature, divisions of creation, and calculation of timeSB 3.25.25 original Sanskrit:

Swami Prabhupada translation:

J.M. Sanyal translation:

Fourth Canto

Consisting of 31 chapters, the fourth canto continues the dialogues of Sukadeva Gosvami, Uddhava, and Maitreya. There are additional layers of dialogue, such as between the sage-avatar Narada and King Pracinabharhisat (as narrated by Maitreya to Vidura). Focusing on the female descendants of Svayambhuva Manu, topics covered include the:

 Genealogies of the daughters of Svayambhuva Manu and of Dhruva (grandson of Svayambhuva Manu) 
 Enmity between Daksa and Shiva, self-immolation of Sati (wife of Shiva and daughter of Daksa), and attack by Shiva on Daksa's ritual
 Liberation of the boy-sage Dhruva, including advice from Narada, his vision of Vishnu, and battles between Dhruva and the Yaksas
 Killing of the tyrant-king Vena by Brahmins before the appearance of the Prthu avatar to restore abundance of the Earth
 Allegorical story, descriptions, and characteristics of King Puranjana, who was reborn as a woman due to thinking of his wife when he died
 Activities of the Pracetas, including meeting with Shiva, instruction from Narada, and ultimate liberation
 Qualities of Krishna, Vaishnava devotion (Bhakti Yoga), the soul (atman), the super-soul (paramatman), and materialistic lifeSB 4.16.17 original Sanskrit:

Swami Prabhupada translation:

Bibek Debroy translation:

 Fifth Canto 

Consisting of 26 chapters, the fifth canto focuses on the dialogue between Sukadeva Gosvami and Pariksit on the banks of the Ganges river. Notable additional layers of dialogue are between the avatar Rsabha and his sons, and between Bharata and King Rahugana (the former was perceived as a fool and made to carry the latter's palanquin). Topics covered include the:

 Appearance, life, and teachings of the publicly-abused avatar Rsabha, the first Tirthankara (spiritual teacher) of Jainism
 Appearance of Hayagriva to return vedic knowledge to Brahma
Activities, character, teachings, and liberation of King Bharata (incarnated as a deer and then a supposed idiot-Brahmin)
 Activities and descendants of King Priyavrata, whose chariot wheels created the seven oceans and islands (i.e. continents)
 Descriptions of the universe, sun, orbits of the planets, and the heavenly and hellish planets
 Flow of the Ganges and expansion of Narayana as Vasudeva (Krishna), Sankarsana, Pradyumna, and Aniruddha
 Glories of Ananta / Sankarsana / Shesha / TamasiSB 5.5.1 original Sanskrit:

Swami Prabhupada translation:

J.M. Sanyal translation:

Sixth Canto

Consisting of 19 chapters, the sixth canto continues with the dialogue between Sukadeva Gosvami and Pariksit on the banks of the Ganges river. A notable additional layer of dialogue is between Yama and his messengers (called the Yamadatas). With the main focus on the battles of the demon-devotee Vrtrasura and his armies against the demigods led by Indra, as well as the life of King Citraketu, topics covered include the:

 Life of Ajamila, a Brahmin that lost liberation due to sex-attraction but was liberated due to calling his son - Narayana  - upon death
 Instructions of Yamaraja to his messengers about justice, punishment, chanting, Vishnu's messengers, and surrender (Bhakti) to Krishna
 Curse of Daksa on Narada, and a genealogy of the daughters of Daksa
 Offence of Indra to Brhaspati, the appearance of Vrtrasura to battle the demigods, their prayers to Narayana and Vrtrasura's death
 Story of King Chitraketu, the murder of his son, instruction from Narada and Angiras, meeting with Krishna, and curse by Parvati
 Vow of Diti to kill Indra, her embryo being cut into 49 pieces by Indra but saved by Vishnu, and her purification through devotion
 Performance of the Pumsavana ceremony for pregnancy with prayers to Vishnu and Lakshmi (Goddess of Wealth and Fortune)SB 6.3.13 original Sanskrit:

Swami Prabhupada translation:

Bibek Debroy translation:

 Seventh Canto 

Consisting of 15 chapters, the seventh canto continues with the dialogue between Sukadeva Gosvami and Pariksit on the banks of the Ganges river. A notable additional layer of dialogue is between Narada and Yudhishthira about Prahlada, the devotee-son of the demon-King Hiranyakasipu (brother of Hiranyaksa, destroyed by the Varaha avatar in the third canto; the demonic brothers are incarnations of Jaya and Vijaya). Prahlada, protected by Krishna, survives multiple attempts to kill him until the arrival of the Nrsimha avatar to destroy his father, who could not be killed by any weapon, by any man or beast, or in the water, air, or on land. Topics covered include the:

 Vow of demon-King Hiranyakasipu to destroy Vishnu, his austerities to become invincible, and conquering of the entire universe
 Birth, abuse, and teachings of the devotee Prahlada, son of Hiranyakasipu, protected from death by Krishna
 Arrival of the Nrsimha avatar to destroy Hiranyakasipu, later pacified by the prayers of Prahlada
 Perfect society in the form of the four social and four spiritual classes or orders
 Behaviour of a good person, ideal family life, and instructions to be civilised
 Exposition that the absolute truth is a person - Krishna - who is the master and controller of all
 Previous incarnations of Narada, and that Krishna lived with the Pandavas like an ordinary human beingSB 7.14.9 original Sanskrit:

Swami Prabhupada translation:

J.M. Sanyal translation:

Eighth Canto

Consisting of 24 chapters, the eighth canto continues the dialogue between Sukadeva Gosvami and Pariksit on the banks of the Ganges river. A notable additional layer of dialogue is between the Vamana avatar and King Bali about the demon-King Hiranyakasipu. Topics covered include the:

 Details and ages of the four Manus (Svayambhuva, Svarocisa, Uttama, and Tamasa), and of the future Manus
 Elephant Gajendra, rescued from Makara the crocodile by Vishnu riding his mount Garuda, after prayers of surrender
 Battles between the demigods and the demons, the truce brokered by Vishnu, and churning of the ocean of milk by both factions
 Appearance of the Kurma, Dhanvantari, Mohini, and Ajita avatars (and Lakshmi) during the churning of the ocean of milk
 Second appearance of Mohini to beguile Shiva
 Annihilation of the demons by Indra
 Appearance of the Vamana avatar to take back the three worlds from King Bali in three footsteps, and the surrender of Bali to Him
 Appearance of the Matsya avatar to save devotee-King Satyavrata from the flood (during the time of Hiranyaksa in the third canto)SB 8.5.30 original Sanskrit:

Swami Prabhupada translation:

Bibek Debroy translation:
In 7th chapter of eighth canto mentioned Lord Shiva is also non different from Brahman. He is supreme ruler of the universe and the eternal refugee of all living beings.

Motilal Banarsidass Publications:

 Ninth Canto 

Consisting of 24 chapters, the ninth canto continues the dialogue between Sukadeva Gosvami and Pariksit on the banks of the Ganges river. With no notable additional layers of dialogue, the primary focus is upon the male dynasties of various ruling figures (the female sides are covered in the fourth canto). Topics covered include the:

 Pastimes of the Rama avatar that destroyed the demon-King Ravana (and Kumbhakarna; incarnations of Jaya and Vijaya)
 Appearance of the Parashurama avatar to repeatedly destroy the corrupt, Godless ruling (Kshatriya) class
Genealogy and downfall of Saubhari Muni due to sex-desire (after seeing fish copulate), and his liberation through performing austerities
Story of King Yayati, cursed to suffer old age; after passing the curse to his son, he learned the futility of sense-pleasure and achieved liberation
 Story of King Pururava, beguiled by the Apsara Urvasi, until he sated his lusty desires with a ceremonial fire
 Genealogies of the sons of Svayambhuva Manu, and of the Kings Mandhata, Amsuman, Yayati, Bharata, Ajamidha, Puru, and Pururava
Genealogy of Krishna, and brief descriptions of His beauty and pastimesSB 9.24.59 original Sanskrit:

Swami Prabhupada translation:

Bibek Debroy translation (the J.M. Sanyal translation is missing verse 58 onwards of this chapter):

 Tenth Canto 

Consisting of 90 chapters, the tenth canto continues the dialogue between Sukadeva Gosvami and Pariksit on the banks of the Ganges river. Notable additional layers of dialogue all involve the lila (divine play) of the supreme and transcendental Krishna avatar. Thus focusing on the appearance and pastimes of Krishna, topics covered include the:

 Imprisonment of Krishna's parents (Vasudeva Anakadundubhi and Devaki), the murder of His siblings, and attempted murder of baby Krishna by King Kamsa
 Fostering of Krishna and Balarama by Nanda and Yashoda (Gopas, a tribe of cowherds); Yashoda saw the universal form in boy-Krishna's mouth
 Attempts on baby and boy-Krishna's life by various demons, mostly sent by Kamsa (e.g. Putana, Trnavarta, Aghasura, Pralamba, Kesi, etc.)
 Chastisement of Kaliya, swallowing of a forest fire, lifting of Govardhana Hill, stealing of Gopis' clothes, and the Rasa dance
 Raas Leela is described very thoroughly and is shown in great detail in the Tenth Canto.
Defeat of numerous demonic foes (e.g. Kamsa, Jarasandha, Kalayavana, Narakasura, Paundraka, etc.) to diminish the burden of the Earth
 Marriages to over 16,000 wives (and children with each), establishment of Dvaraka, return of the Syamantaka Jewel, and washing of Narada's feet
Defeat of Banasura and Shiva, daily activities, blessing of Sudama, blessing of His devotees, saving of Shiva from Vrkasura, and summary of gloriesSB 10.90.50 original Sanskrit:

Disciples of Swami Prabhupada translation:

J.M. Sanyal translation:

 Study 
The largest canto with 4,000 verses, the tenth canto is also the most popular and widely studied part of the Bhagavata. It has also been translated, commented on, and published separately from the rest of the Srimad Bhagavatam. A. C. Bhaktivedanta Swami Prabhupada stated this canto is distinct from the others, albeit while warning against studying it before reading the previous nine:

Eleventh Canto

Consisting of 31 chapters, the eleventh canto continues the dialogue between Sukadeva Gosvami and Pariksit on the banks of the Ganges river. Notable additional layers of dialogue are between Narada and Vasudeva, and between Krishna and Uddhava (and in turn, other dialogues such as that between the Hamsa (swan) avatar and Brahma). Topics covered include the:

 Curse and destruction of the Yadu Dynasty (through intoxicated in-fighting) at Prabhasa to relieve the burden of the Earth
 Appearance of the Hamsa (swan) avatar to answer the questions of the sons of Brahma
 Discourse of Narada to Vasudeva about the instruction of the '9 Yogendras' to King Nimi about Bhakti for Krishna 
 Final teachings of Krishna to Uddhava at Dvaraka (e.g. the story of a young Brahmin avadhuta narrating his 24 gurus to King Yadu)
 Disappearance of Krishna after being shot in the foot by the hunter, Jara
 Flood and destruction of DvarkaSB 11.7.33-35 original Sanskrit:

Disciples of Swami Prabhupada translation:

Swami Ambikananda Saraswati translation:

 The Uddhava or Hamsa Gita 
Containing the final teachings of Krishna to His devotee Uddhava, the eleventh canto is also referred to as the 'Uddhava Gita' or 'Hamsa Gita'. Like the tenth canto, it has also been translated and published separately, usually as a companion or 'sequel' to the Bhagavad Gita. 'Hamsa' means 'swan' or 'spirit', and:

 Is the name of the single class or order of society in Satya Yuga (as compared to four in Kali Yuga), the first and purest of the four cyclical yugas
 Symbolises Brahman (Ultimate Truth, Self, or Atman) in Hinduism
 Is the mount ridden by Brahma
 Is the name of the tenth (i.e. swan) avatar of Krishna that taught the Vedas to Brahma (hence the symbolism of the swan being ridden by Brahma as a mount).

Twelfth Canto

Consisting of 13 chapters, the twelfth and final canto completes the dialogue between Sukadeva Gosvami and Pariksit on the banks of the Ganges river, and ends with the overarching dialogue between Sukadeva Gosvami and the group of sages led by Saunaka, at the forest of Naimisaranya. Focusing on prophecies and signs of Kali Yuga, topics covered in this canto include the: 

 Degradation of rulers as liars and plunderers, and the symptoms of the age of Kali (e.g. atheism, political intrigue, low character of royals, etc.) 
 A list of the future rulers of the world, and the way they attained downfall
 Final instructions to and death of Pariksit due to his curse (bitten by a poisonous serpent Takshaka)
 Prayers of sage Markandeya to Nara-Narayana, resistance to Kamadeva sent by Indra to break his vows, and glorification by Shiva and Uma
 Four categories of universal annihilation
 Appearance of the Kalki avatar to destroy evil at the end of Kali Yuga
 Description of the lesser and greater Puranas, and the eighteen major Puranas
 Description of the Mahapurusa
 Summary and glories of the Srimad BhagavatamSB 12.13.11-12 original Sanskrit:

Disciples of Swami Prabhupada translation:

A Wikipedia editor's translation:

Philosophy
While Bhakti Yoga and Dvaita Vedanta are the prominent teachings, states T. S. Rukmani, various passages show a synthesis that also includes Samkhya, Yoga, Vedanta, and Advaita Vedanta.

 Bhakti 

Cutler states the Bhagavata is among the most important texts on bhakti, presenting a fully developed teaching that originated with the Bhagavad Gita. Bryant states that while classical yoga attempts to shut down the mind and senses, Bhakti Yoga in the Bhagavata teaches that the mind is transformed by filling it with thoughts of Krishna.

Matchett states that in addition to various didactic philosophical passages the Bhagavata also describes one of the activities that can lead to liberation (moksha) as listening to, reflecting on the stories of, and sharing devotion for Krishna with others. Bhakti is depicted in the Purana, adds Matchett, as both an overpowering emotion as well as a way of life that is rational and deliberately cultivated.

 Samkhya 

Surendranath Dasgupta describes the theistic Samkhya philosophy taught by Kapila in the Bhagavata as the dominant philosophy in the text.

Sheridan points out that in the Third Canto, Kapila is described as an avatar of Vishnu, born as the son of the Prajapati Kardama, in order to share the knowledge of self-realization and liberation with his mother, Devahuti; in the Eleventh Canto, Krishna also teaches Samkhya to Uddhava, describing the world as an illusion, and the individual as dreaming, even while in the waking state. Krishna expounds Samhkhya and Yoga as the way of overcoming the dream, with the goal being Krishna Himself.

Sheridan also states that the treatment of Samkhya in the Bhagavata is also changed by its emphasis on devotion, as does Dasgupta, adding it is somewhat different from other classical Samkhya texts.

 Advaita 

Kumar Das and Sheridan state that the Bhagavata frequently discusses a distinctly advaitic or non-dualistic philosophy of Shankara. Rukmani adds that the concept of moksha is explained as Ekatva (Oneness) and Sayujya (Absorption, intimate union), wherein one is completely lost in Brahman (Self, Supreme Being, one's true nature). This, states Rukmani, is proclamation of a 'return of the individual soul to the Absolute and its merging into the Absolute', which is unmistakably advaitic. The Bhagavata Purana is also stated to parallel the non-duality of Adi Shankara by Sheridan. As an example:

Scholars describe this philosophy as built on the foundation of non-dualism in the Upanishads, and term it as "Advaitic Theism". This term combines the seemingly contradictory beliefs of a personal God that can be worshiped with a God that is immanent in creation and in one's own self. God in this philosophy is within and is not different from the individual self, states Sheridan, and transcends the limitations of specificity and temporality. Sheridan also describes Advaitic Theism as a "both/and" solution for the questions of whether God is transcendent or immanent,  and credits the Bhāgavata with a 'truly creative religious moment' for introducing this philosophy. The text suggests that God Vishnu and the soul (atman) in all beings is one in quality (nirguna).

Bryant states that the monism  in Bhagavata Purana is certainly built on Vedanta foundations, but not exactly the same as the monism of Adi Shankara. The Bhagavata asserts, according to Bryant, that the empirical and the spiritual universe are both metaphysical realities, and manifestations of the same Oneness, just like heat and light are "real but different" manifestations of sunlight.

 Dharma 

Kurmas Das states the Bhagavata Purana conceptualizes a form of Dharma that competes with that of the Vedas, suggesting that Bhakti ultimately leads to Self-knowledge, Moksha (salvation) and bliss. The earliest mention of bhakti is found in the Shvetashvatara Upanishad verse 6.23,Max Muller, Shvetashvatara Upanishad, The Upanishads, Part II, Oxford University Press, page 267 but scholars such as Max Muller state that the word Bhakti appears only once in this Upanishad; and that being in one last verse of the epilogue it could be a later addition, and that the context suggests that it is a panentheistic idea and not theistic.Paul Carus, pages 514-515

Scholarly consensus sees bhakti as a post-Vedic movement that developed primarily during the Puranas era of Indian history. The Bhagavata Purana develops the Bhakti concept more elaborately, states Cutler, proposing "worship without ulterior motive and with kind disposition towards all" as Dharma. T.R. Sharma states the text includes in its scope intellectual and emotional devotion as well as Advaita Vedanta ideas.

The text does not subscribe, states Gupta and Valpey, to context-less "categorical notions of justice or morality", but suggests that "Dharma depends on context". They add that in a positive or neutral context, ethics and moral behavior must be adhered to; and when persistently persecuted by evil, anything that reduces the strength of the "evil and poisonous circumstances" is good. That which is motivated by, furthers, and enables bhakti is the golden standard of Dharma.

 Yoga 

Sarma states that the Bhagavata Purana describes all steps of yoga practice, and characterizes yoga as bhakti, asserting that the most important aspect is the spiritual goal. According to Sarma and Rukmani, the text dedicates numerous chapters to yoga, such as Canto 10 (chapter 11), which begins with a declaration that Siddhi results from concentrating one's mind on Krishna, adding this substitutes the concept of a "personal god" in the Yogasutras of Patanjali, and contrasts with Patanjali's view that Siddhi is considered powerful but an obstacle to Samadhi.

In other chapters of the text, Rukmani states, Śuka describes different meditations on aspects of Krishna, in a way that is similar to the Yoga Sutras of Patanjali.  However, adds Bryant, the Bhagavata Purana recommends the object of concentration as Krishna, thus folding in yoga as a form of bhakti and the "union with the divine". Bryant describes the synthesis of ideas in Bhagavata Purana as:

Sheridan as well as Pintchman affirm Bryant's view, adding that the Vedantic view emphasized in the Bhagavata is non-dualist, as described within a reality of plural forms.

Significance
The source of many popular stories of Krishna's pastimes for centuries in the Indian subcontinent, the Bhagavata Purana is widely recognized as the best-known and most influential of the Puranas, and as a part of Vedic literature (the Puranas, Itihasa epics, and Upanishads) is referred to as the "Fifth Veda". It is important in Indian religious literature for its emphasis on the practice of devotion compared to the more theoretical approach of the Bhagavad Gita, for challenging the ritualism of the Vedas, and for its extended description of a God in human form.

 Hindu Festivals 
The stories in the Bhagavata Purana are also the legends quoted by one generation to the next in Vaishnavism, during annual festivals such as Holi and Diwali.Selina Thielemann (1998), Sounds of the Sacred Music in India, APH, pages 96-98

The International Society for Krishna Consciousness (ISKCON) celebrates the promise of Canto 12, Chapter 13, Verse 13 by distributing sets of Srimad Bhagavatam leading up to the full-moon day of the month of Bhādra (Bhādra Purnima) in India and around the world.  Disciples of Swami Prabhupada translation:

 Vaishnavism 

 Gaudiya Vaishnavism 

The Bhagavata has played a significant role in the emergence of the Krishna-bhakti (Gaudiya Vaishnavism) movement of Lord Chaitanya (1486–1534 CE), in Bengal. The scriptural basis for the belief that Lord Chaitanya is an avatar of Krishna is found in verses such as the following (Disciples of Swami Prabhupada translation):

Chaitanya is commonly referred to as 'Gauranga' in regards to His golden complexion (as detailed in the Gauranga article, the Sanskrit word 'ākṛṣṇaṁ' means 'not blackish' and 'golden'), and is most notable for popularising the Hare Krishna maha-mantra. In regards to not being explicitly named as an avatar (unlike others such as Kalki) in the Bhagavata, this is also explained (Swami Prabhupada translation):

The key word in this verse in regards to Krishna incarnating in the age of Kali Yuga is 'channaḥ'''' (Sanskrit छन्न), which means ' hidden', 'secret', or 'disguised'. In Gaudiya Vaishnavism, Chaitanya is accepted as a hidden avatar of Krishna that appeared in the age of Kali (also known as 'the Iron Age' and 'the age of quarrel') as His own devotee to show the easiest way to achieve Krishna Consciousness. Modern Gaudiya movements such as the Gaudiya Math (established by Bhaktisiddhanta Sarasvati in 1920) and others established by disciples of Bhaktisiddhanta Sarasvati, such as the International Society for Krishna Consciousness (by A.C. Bhaktivedanta Prabhupada in 1966) and the Sri Chaitanya Saraswat Math (by Bhakti Rakshak Sridhar in 1941), trace their disciplic lineages back directly to Lord Chaitanya.

 Other Vaishnava Traditions 
In the 15th–16th century Ekasarana Dharma in Assam, a panentheistic tradition whose proponents, Sankardeva and Madhavdeva, acknowledge that their theological positions are rooted in the Bhagavata Purana, purged of doctrines that find no place in Assamese Vaishnavism and adding a monist commentary instead.

In northern and western India the Bhagavata Purana has influenced the Hari Bhakti Vilasa and Haveli-style Krishna temples found in Braj region near Mathura-Vrindavan. The text complements the Pancharatra Agama texts of Vaishnavism. While the text focuses on Krishna "Lord Narayana (Vishnu) himself appears and explains how Brahma and Shiva should never be seen as independent and different from him". The sixth book includes the feminine principle as Shakti, or goddess Devi, conceptualizing her as the "energy and creative power" of the masculine yet a manifestation of a sexless Brahman, presented in a language suffused with Hindu monism.

Jainism and Buddhism
The fifth canto of the Bhagavata Purana is significant for its inclusion of legends about the first Tirthankara of Jainism, Rishabha, as an avatar of Vishnu. Further, his father Nabhi is mentioned as one of the Manus and his mother Marudevi also finds a mention. It further mentions the 100 sons of Rishabha including Bharata. While homage to Shakyamuni Buddha is included in by declaring him as an avatar of Vishnu, the interpretation of Buddhism-related stories in the Purana range from honor to ambivalence to polemics wherein prophecies predict some will distort and misrepresent the teachings of the Vedas, and attempt to sow confusion.Ludo Rocher (1986), The Puranas, Otto Harrassowitz Verlag, pages 110-111 According to T. S. Rukmani, the Bhagavata Purana is also significant in asserting that Yoga practice is a form of Bhakti.

 The Arts 

The Bhagavata Purana played a key role in the history of Indian theatre, music, and dance, particularly through the tradition of Ras and Leela. These are dramatic enactments about Krishna's pastimes. Some of the text's legends have inspired secondary theatre literature such as the eroticism in Gita Govinda. While Indian dance and music theatre traces its origins to the ancient Sama Veda and Natyasastra texts, the Bhagavata Purana and other Krishna-related texts such as Harivamsa and Vishnu Purana  have inspired numerous choreographic themes.

Many 'Ras' plays dramatise episodes related in the Rasa Panchadhyayi ("Five chapters of the Celestial Dance"; Canto 10, Chapters 29–33) of the Bhagavatam. The Bhagavatam also encourages theatrical performance as a means to propagate the faith (BP 11.11.23 and 36, 11.27.35 and 44, etc.), and this has led to the emergence of several theatrical forms centred on Krishna all across India. Canto 10 of Bhagavatam is regarded as the inspiration for many classical dance styles such as Kathak, Odissi, Manipuri and Bharatnatyam. Bryant summarizes the influence as follows,

Commentaries and translations

 Commentaries 
The Bhagavata Purana is one of the most commented texts in Indian literature. There is a saying in Sanskrit - vidyā bhāgavatāvadhi - Bhāgavatam is the limit of one's learning. Hence throughout the centuries it attracted a host of commentators from all schools of Krishna worshippers. Over eighty medieval era Bhāṣya (scholarly reviews and commentaries) in Sanskrit alone are known, and many more commentaries exist in various Indian languages. The oldest exegetical commentary presently known is Tantra-Bhagavata from the Pancaratra school. Other commentaries include:

 Advaita Vedanta commentaries Bhāvārtha-dīpikā by Śrīdhara Svāmī (15th century CE).Gupta, Ravi M. Why Śrīdhara Svāmī? The Makings of a Successful Sanskrit Commentary According to Ravi M. Gupta, this commentary "exerted extraordinary influence on later Bhāgavata commentaries, and indeed, on Vaiṣṇava traditions more generally." This influence is "particularly true of the Caitanya Vaiṣṇava commentaries by Sanātana Gosvāmi, Jīva Gosvāmī, Viśvanātha Cakravartī, and others." Amrtatarangini by Laksmidhara (15th century CE)
A commentary by Madhusūdana Sarasvatī (c.1540–1640) on the first verse of the Bhagavata Purana

 Acintya-bhedābheda Commentaries 

 Caitanya-mata-mañjuṣā - Śrīnātha Cakravartī
 Bṛhad-vaiṣṇava-toṣiṇī - Sanātana Gosvāmī
 Laghu-Vaiṣṇava-toṣiṇī - Jīva Gosvāmī
 Krama-sandarbha  - Jīva Gosvāmī
 Bṛhat-krama-sandarbha - Jīva Gosvāmī (attributed)
 Ṣaṭ-sandarbhas by Jīva Gosvāmī (16th century CE)
 Sārārtha Darśinī - Vishvanatha Chakravarti (17th century CE) - elaborate commentary
 Vaiṣṇavānandinī - Baladeva Vidyābhūṣaṇa
 Dīpika-dīpanī - Rādharamaṇa Gosvāmī
 Gauḍīya-bhāṣya - Bhaktisiddhanta Saraswati (20th century CE) - elaborate commentary
 Bhaktivedānta Purports - A.C. Bhaktivedanta Swami Prabhupada (20th century CE) - elaborate commentary

 Dvaita commentaries 
 Bhāgavata Tātparya Nirṇaya by Madhvacharya (13th century CE) 
 Pada-ratnavali by Vijayadhvaja Tīrtha (15th century CE) - elaborate commentary
 Bhagvata Tatparya Nirnaya Tippani by Yadupati Acharya (16th century)
 Duraghatabhavadipa by Satyabhinava Tirtha (17th century CE)
 Bhaghavata-Sarodhara by Adavi Jayatirthacharya (18th century CE)
 Srimadbhagavata Tippani by Satyadharma Tirtha (18th century CE)

 Dvaitādvaita Commentaries
 Siddhānta pradīpikā - Śuka-sudhī
 Bhāvārtha dīpikā prakāsha - Vamshīdhara
 Anvitārtha prakāśikā - Gaṅgāsahāya

 Suddhādvaita Commentaries 
 Subodhini by Vallabha
Bhagavatārtha Prakarana by Vallabha
Dashama Skandha Anukramanikā by Vallabha
 Ṭippaṇī - Gosvāmī Viṭṭhalanātha
 Subodhinī prakāsha - Gosvāmī Puruṣhottama
 Bāla prabodhinī - Gosvāmī Giridharlāl
 Viśuddha rasadīpikā - Kishorī prasāda

 Viśiṣṭādvaita Commentaries 
 Śuka pakṣīyā - Sudarśana sūri
 Bhāgavata-candrikā - Vīrarāghava (14th century CE) - elaborate commentary
 Bhakta-rañjanī - Bhagavat prasāda

Others
 Hanumad-Bhasya Vasana-bhasya Sambandhoki Vidvat-kamadhenu Paramahamsa-priya Suka-hridaya Mukta-phala and Hari-lilamrita by Vopadeva
 Bhakti-ratnavali by Visnupuri
 Bhakti-Ratnakar by Srimanta Sankardev 
 Ekanathi Bhagavata by Saint Eknath of Paithan (16th century CE, on the 11th Canto in the vernacular language of the Indian state of Maharashtra)Narayaneeyam by Melpathur Bhattathiri of Kerala (1586, a condensed Srimad Bhagavatam)Bhagavata-Purana by S.S. Shulba (2017, original Sanskrit); other Sanskrit manuscripts are available
 A study of the Bhagavata Purana or Esoteric Hinduism by P.N. Sinha (1901)

 Translations 
The Bhagavata has been rendered into various Indian and non-Indian languages. A version of it is available in almost every Indian language, with forty translations alone in the Bengali language. From the eighteenth century onwards, the text became the subject of scholarly interest and Victorian disapproval, with the publication of a French translation followed by an English one. The following is a partial list of translations:

 Assamese 

 Bhagavata of Sankara (1449-1568 CE, primary theological source for Mahapurushiya Dharma in the Indian state of Assam) Katha Bhagavata by Bhattadeva  (Prose translation 16th century CE)

 Bengali 
  Sri Krishna-Vijaya by Maladhara Basu, a translation of the 10th Canto and a bit from others
 Krishna prema tarangini by Shri Raghunatha Bhagavatacharya (15th Century CE)

 Hindi 

 Bhagavata Mahapurana published by Gita Press (2017)

 Kannada 

 Bhagavata Mahapurana by Vidwan Motaganahalli Ramashesha Sastri (foreword by historian S. Srikanta Sastri)
Odia
 Odia Bhagabata by Jagannatha Dasa (15th Century CE)

 Telugu Andhra Maha Bhagavatam by the poet Pothana (15th century CE). It is considered as "the crown jewel of Telugu literature".

 English The Śrīmad Bhāgavatam by A. C. Bhaktivedanta Swami Prabhupada (1970–77, includes transliterations, synonyms, and purports). Swami Prabhupada completed cantos 1 through 9 and the first ten chapters of canto 10 before he died. After his departure, a team of his disciples completed the work, which was then published by the Bhaktivedenta Book Trust.A prose English translation of Shrimadbhagabatam by M.N. Dutt (1895, unabridged)Bhagavata Purana by Motilal Banarsidass Publishers (1950, unabridged)
 The Srimad Bhagavatam by J.M. Sanyal (1970, abridged)
 The Bhagavata Purana by Ganesh Vasudeo Tagare (1976, unabridged)
 Srimad Bhagavata by Swami Tapasyananda (1980, unabridged)
A Translation by B.P. Yati Maharaj of Mayapur Sri Chaitanya Math
Reading from Bhagabata by Gananath Das which has been translated from Odia Bhagabata
 Bhagavata Mahapurana by C.L. Goswami and M.A. Shastri (2006, unabridged, Gita Press)
 Śrīmad Bhāgavatam with the Sārārtha darśini commentary of Viśvanātha Cakravartī by Swami Bhānu (2010)Srimad Bhagavata Purana by Anand Aadhar (2012)
 The Bhagavata Purana by Bibek Debroy (2019, unabridged)
 Śrīmad Bhāgavatam with the Krama sandarbha commentary of Jīva Gosvāmī by Swami Bhānu (2019)
 Śrīmad Bhāgavatam with the Vaiṣṇavānandinī commentary of Baladeva Vidyābhūṣaṇa by Swami Bhānu (2022-23)

 English (partial translations and paraphrases) 

 Kṛṣṇa: The Supreme Personality of Godhead by A. C. Bhaktivedanta Swami Prabhupada (part translation, condensed version: summary study and paraphrase of Canto 10)
Vallabhacarya on the Love Games of Krishna by James D. Redington (English translation of Vallabha's commentary on the Rāsa-Panchyādhyāyi)The Bhagavata Purana; Book X by Nandini Nopani and P. Lal (1997)
 Krishna: The Beautiful Legend of God: Srimad Bhagavata Purana Book X by Edwin F. Bryant (2004)
 The Wisdom of God: Srimat Bhagavatam by Swami Prabhavananda (part translation, part summary and paraphrase)
 
 The Uddhava Gita by Swami Ambikananda Saraswati (2000, prose translation of Canto 11)
 Bhagavata Purana by Ramesh Menon (2007, a 'retelling' based on other translations)
 Bhakti Yoga: Tales and Teachings from the Bhagavata Purana by Edwin F. Bryant (2017, selections of verses and commentary)
Bṛhad Vaiṣṇnava Toṣaṇī (Canto 10) of Sanātana Gosvāmī by Swami Bhānu (2020)
Laghu Vaiṣṇava Toṣaṇī (Canto 10) of Jīva Gosvāmī by Swami Bhānu (2020)

 French 

 Bagavadam ou Bhagavata Purana by Maridas Poullé (1769)
 Le Bhagavata Purana by Eugene Burnouf (1840)

See also

Srimad Bhagavata Book 1
Srimad Bhagavata Book 2
Srimad Bhagavata Book 3
Bhagavan
Vishnu
Bhakti
Narayana
Krishna
Nava rasas
Puranas
Vedanta

Notes

References
Citations

Sources

 

Further reading
Mani, Vettam. Puranic Encyclopedia''. 1st English ed. New Delhi: Motilal Banarsidass, 1975.
 C Mackenzie Brown (1983), The Origin and Transmission of the Two "Bhāgavata Purāṇas": A Canonical and Theological Dilemma, Journal of the American Academy of Religion, Vol. 51, No. 4, pages 551-567
 Edwin Bryant (2004), Krishna: The Beautiful Legend of God: Srimad Bhagavata Purana Book X, Penguin, 
 Sanjukta Gupta (2006), Advaita Vedanta and Vaisnavism: The Philosophy of Madhusudana Sarasvati, Routledge, 
 Ravi Gupta and Kenneth Valpey (2013), The Bhagavata Purana: Sacred Text and Living Tradition, Columbia University Press, 
 Ithamar Theodor (2015), Exploring the Bhagavata Purana, IB Tauris,

External links

English
Swami Prabhupāda's version Bhaktivedanta Vedabase
 Gita Press version
The Translation of Sankaradeva's Gunamala - the 'pocket-Bhagavata' (Assam version)
Translation of Sankaradeva's Veda-Stuti (The Prayer of the Vedas), Bhagavata, Book X, from Sankaradeva's Kirttana Ghosa, the 'Bhagavata in miniature'
Bhagavata Purana Research Project, Oxford University
A prose English translation of Srimad Bhagavatam, MN Dutt (Open access limited to the US and parts of Europe)
Bhagavata Purana Research Project, (Srimad Bhagavatam English Version)
An Android app with text in Devanagari and IAST, two different English translations and two different recitations: Srimad Bhagavatam (English)

Sanskrit original
GRETIL etext: The transliterated Sanskrit text for the entire work
Bhagavata Purana (Sanskrit)
Searchable transliterated PDF file of the entire Bhagavata-Purana from sanskritweb.net

Krishna
Puranas
Hindu texts
Vaishnava texts
Gaudiya Vaishnavism